Moisture sensitivity level (MSL) is a rating that shows a device's susceptibility to damage due to absorbed moisture when subjected to reflow soldering as defined in J-STD-020.
It relates to the packaging and handling precautions for some semiconductors. The MSL is an electronic standard for the time period in which a moisture sensitive device can be exposed to ambient room conditions (30 °C/85%RH at Level 1; 30 °C/60%RH at all other levels).

Increasingly, semiconductors have been manufactured in smaller sizes. Components such as thin fine-pitch devices and ball grid arrays could be damaged during SMT reflow when moisture trapped inside the component expands.

The expansion of trapped moisture can result in internal separation (delamination) of the plastic from the die or lead-frame, wire bond damage, die damage, and internal cracks. Most of this damage is not visible on the component surface. In extreme cases, cracks will extend to the component surface. In the most severe cases, the component will bulge and pop. This is known as the "popcorn" effect. This occurs when part temperature rises rapidly to a high maximum during the soldering (assembly) process. This does not occur when part temperature rises slowly and to a low maximum during a baking (preheating) process.

Moisture sensitive devices are packaged in a moisture barrier antistatic bag with a desiccant and a moisture indicator card which is sealed.

Moisture sensitivity levels are specified in technical standard IPC/JEDEC Moisture/reflow Sensitivity Classification for Nonhermetic Surface-Mount Devices. The times indicate how long components can be outside of dry storage before they have to be baked to remove any absorbed moisture.

 MSL 6  – Mandatory bake before use
 MSL 5A – 24 hours
 MSL 5  – 48 hours
 MSL 4  – 72 hours
 MSL 3  – 168 hours
 MSL 2A – 4 weeks
 MSL 2  – 1 year
 MSL 1  – Unlimited floor life

Practical 

MSL-specified parts must be baked before assembly if their exposure has exceeded the rating. Once assembled, moisture sensitivity is generally no longer a factor.

References

External links 
https://www.ipc.org/TOC/IPC-JEDEC-J-STD-020E.pdf
https://www.bourns.com/docs/RoHS-MSL/msl_mf.pdf
 https://electronics.stackexchange.com/questions/23044/ics-with-humidity-or-moisture-sensitivity-bake-recommendations

Integrated circuits
Semiconductors